The Greater Taunton Area is the suburban area surrounding the city of Taunton, in northeastern Bristol County, Massachusetts. It comprises various present-day municipalities that were once under the jurisdiction of Taunton in Colonial America. These present-day municipalities include the towns of Berkley, Dighton, Norton, and Raynham.

See also 
Berkley, Massachusetts
Bristol County, Massachusetts
Dighton, Massachusetts
Dighton Rock and Dighton Rock State Park
Massasoit State Park
Norton, Massachusetts
Raynham, Massachusetts
Silver City Galleria
Taunton, Massachusetts
Taunton River
Taunton River Watershed

External links 
Southeastern Regional Planning & Economic Development's Official Home Page
Bristol County Convention & Visitors Bureau's Official Home Page
Bristol County Superior Courthouse (in Taunton)
Old Colony Historical Society's Official Home Page 
Greater Attleboro Taunton Regional Transit Authority's Official Home Page
City of Taunton's Official Home Page
Town of Berkley
Town of Dighton's Official Home Page
Town of Norton's Official Home Page
Town of Raynham's Official Home Page

 
Taunton, Massachusetts